Pyonephrosis (Greek pyon "pus" + nephros "kidney") is an infection of the kidneys' collecting system. Pus collects in the renal pelvis and causes distension of the kidney. It can cause kidney failure.

Cause

Pyonephrosis is sometimes a complication of kidney stones, which can be a source of persisting infection. It may also occur spontaneously. It can occur as a complication of hydronephrosis or pyelonephritis.

Diagnosis

CECT is investigation of choice.

Treatment
This requires drainage, best performed by ureteral stent placement or nephrostomy.
Surgery - Nephrectomy, if the ureter affects - Nephroureterectomy.
If the second kidney is not healthy, only drainage of the kidney or puncture nephrostomy is performed.

See also
 Pyelonephritis
 Nephrotic syndrome

References

External links 

Medical terminology
Kidney diseases